3rd Ward may refer to:

Places
Canada
Barrhaven Ward, Ottawa (also known as Ward 3)

United States
3rd Ward of New Orleans, a ward of New Orleans, Louisiana
Historic Third Ward, Milwaukee, a historic district of Milwaukee, Wisconsin
Third Ward (Atlanta), a historic ward of Atlanta, Georgia
Third Ward, Charlotte, a ward of Charlotte, North Carolina
Third Ward, Houston, a neighborhood of Houston, Texas
Ward 3 of the District of Columbia, a ward of Washington, D.C.
Ward 3, St. Louis City, an aldermanic ward of St. Louis, Missouri

Zimbabwe
Ward 3, the name of several wards of Zimbabwe

Other uses
3rd Ward Brooklyn, a defunct art company in Brooklyn, New York, U.S.
The Church of Jesus Christ of Latter-day Saints and the Kingdom of God, a Mormon fundamentalist sect in Utah, U.S.
Ward 3 (film), a 2012 film featuring James Phelps